Searles Gregory Shultz (April 29, 1897 – January 23, 1976) was an American lawyer and politician from New York.

Life
He was born on April 29, 1897, in Skaneateles, Onondaga County, New York. He graduated from Skaneateles High School in 1916. During World War I he served in the U.S. Army. He graduated from Cornell Law School in 1921. He married Dorothy Hall (1898–1978), and they had three children.

Shultz was a member of the New York State Assembly from 1947 to 1954, sitting in the 166th, 167th, 168th and 169th New York State Legislatures.

He was a member of the New York State Senate (44th D.) from 1955 to 1958, sitting in the 170th and 171st New York State Legislatures.

He died on January 23, 1976, after being struck by a vehicle during winter storm conditions and was buried at the Lakeview Cemetery in Skaneateles.

His daughter Juanita (Shultz) Newell (1929–2013) was for 28 years Town Clerk of Skaneateles.

Sources

1897 births
1975 deaths
People from Skaneateles, New York
Republican Party New York (state) state senators
Republican Party members of the New York State Assembly
Cornell Law School alumni
20th-century American politicians
United States Army personnel of World War I